PEQ or variation may refer to:

 Southern Pomo language (ISO 639 language code peq)
 Pecos Municipal Airport (IATA airport code PEQ), Reeves County, Texas, USA
 PEQ targetting electronics, see List of military electronics of the United States
 peq (撥), an article, an element of linguistics, in the Shanghainese language

 Programme de l’expérience québécoise (PEQ) immigration program, of Quebec in Canada
 Project EverQuest (ProjectEQ)
 Psychological Evaluation Questionnaire, see 16PF Questionnaire

See also

 PEC (disambiguation)
 Pec (disambiguation)
 Peck (disambiguation)
 Pek (disambiguation)
 PEK (disambiguation)
 Peque (disambiguation)